Dance in Malaysia encompasses dance traditions from many different ethic origins. Malay dances include Dance Dramas, Court Dramas, and Folk Dances. Other dances come from Javanese, Orang Asli, Portuguese, Siamese, Dayak, Moro, and Chinese traditions. This article includes a list of dances, organised by ethic origin.

List of dances

Malay Dance-Dramas 
 Jikey
 Mek Mulung
 Bangsawan
 Mak Yong
 Randai

Malay Court Dances 
 Mak Inang
 Terinai
 Asyik
 Inai
 Joget Gamelan

Malay Folk Dances 
 Boria
 Ghazal Parti
 Canggung
 Dabus
 Dikir Barat
 Ulek Mayang
 Rodat
 Saba
 Joget
 Joget Lambak
 Asli
 Silat
 Zapin
 Masri
 Indang
 Lilin
 Piring
 Dansa

Javanese Folk Dances 
 Kuda Kepang
 Barongan
 Ronggeng

Orang Asli 
 Sewang

Portuguese 
 Branyo

Siam 
 Menora
 Rambong
 Tomoi

Dayak 
 Magutanip
 Ngajat
 Sumazau
 Lansaran
 Datun Julud

Moro 
 Pangalay

Chinese 
 Fan dance
 Lion dance
 Dragon dance
 24 Festive Drum

See also
 Culture of Malaysia
 Malays (ethnic group)